Velingrad Peninsula is the ice-covered peninsula projecting 22.5 km in northwest direction from Graham Coast on the west side of Antarctic Peninsula.  Bounded by Barilari Bay to the northeast and Holtedahl Bay to the southwest, and separated from Biscoe Islands to the northwest by Grandidier Channel.  Its base is surmounted by Chiren Heights.  The UK station Prospect Point operated at the west extremity of the peninsula in 1957–59.

The peninsula is named after the city of Velingrad in Southern Bulgaria.

Location
British mapping in 1971 and 1976.

Maps
 British Antarctic Territory.  Scale 1:200000 topographic map. DOS 610 Series, Sheet W 65 64.  Directorate of Overseas Surveys, Tolworth, UK, 1971.
 British Antarctic Territory.  Scale 1:200000 topographic map. DOS 610 Series, Sheet W 66 64.  Directorate of Overseas Surveys, Tolworth, UK, 1976.
Antarctic Digital Database (ADD). Scale 1:250000 topographic map of Antarctica. Scientific Committee on Antarctic Research (SCAR). Since 1993, regularly upgraded and updated.

References
 Bulgarian Antarctic Gazetteer. Antarctic Place-names Commission. (details in Bulgarian, basic data in English)
 Velingrad Peninsula. SCAR Composite Gazetteer of Antarctica

External links
 Velingrad Peninsula. Copernix satellite image

Peninsulas of Graham Land
Bulgaria and the Antarctic
Graham Coast